Steppin' Into Beauty is an album by pianist Hilton Ruiz, collecting performances recorded in 1977 at the sessions that produced Excition and New York Hilton, which was released on the Danish label SteepleChase in 1982.

Track listing 
 "Origin" (Pharoah Sanders) – 9:59
 "Steppin' into Beauty" (Rahsaan Roland Kirk) – 5:26
 "The Last Profit" (Roy Brooks) – 7:20
 "The Goal" (Hakim Jami) – 6:50
 "Excition" (Frank Foster) – 13:33

Personnel 
Hilton Ruiz – piano
Richard Williams – trumpet (tracks 1, 3 & 5)
Frank Foster – tenor saxophone (tracks 1, 3 & 5)
Hakim Jami (tracks 2 & 4), Buster Williams (tracks 1, 3 & 5) – bass
Roy Brooks (tracks 1, 3 & 5), Steve Solder (tracks 2 & 4) – drums

References 

Hilton Ruiz albums
1982 albums
SteepleChase Records albums